Well Lee (Chinese: 李炜; born December 6, 1988 in Fujian, China) is a Chinese singer, who first gained notice by winning the 2010 Happy Boy singing competition.

Biography  
Well Lee later became a graduate from Fujian Art Professional Institute. He participated in 2007 Happy Boy singing competition, but failed to enter the national finals. In 2010, he again participated in the Hunan TV Super Boy and finally won the championship.

Happy Boy 
Lee's attendance experience at the 2010 Hunan TV Super Boy is listed below.

Discography 

His first personal album [造梦者-dreamer] is coming out is the middle of October 2012

References 
http://data.ent.sina.com.cn/star/13318.html

http://ent.hunantv.com/v/mxgw/kn/liwei/

http://www.cutehotguys.com/Chinese-Men/2010_super_boy_champion_well_lee_li_wei_gallery/

External links 
 http://blog.sina.com.cn/u/1230928585
 http://ent.hunantv.com/y/20110701/939561.html

1988 births
Living people
Singers from Fujian
Musicians from Fuzhou
Super Boy contestants
People from Lianjiang County